Night Call Nurses is a 1972 American sex comedy film directed by Jonathan Kaplan. It is the third in Roger Corman's "nurses" cycle of films, starting with The Student Nurses (1970).

Plot
Three young nurses work in a psych ward at a hospital. Barbara (Patty Byrne) comes under the influence of a charismatic sex therapist and is stalked by a mysterious nurse. Janis (Alana Hamilton) has an affair with a truck-driving patient who is addicted to drugs. Sandra (Mittie Lawrence) becomes politicised through an affair with a black militant and helps a prisoner escape from the hospital.

Cast
Patty Byrne as Barbara
Alana Hamilton as Janis
Mittie Lawrence as Sandra
Clint Kimbrough as Dr. Bramlett
Felton Perry as Jude
Stack Pierce as Sampson
Richard Young as Kyle Toby
Martin Ashe as Bathrobe Benny
Bob Brogan as George
Tris Coffin as Miles Bailey
Dennis Dugan as Kit
Lynne Guthrie as Cynthia
Bobby Hall as Warden Kelley
Barbara Keene as Chloe
Christopher Law as Zach
Dick Miller as driver

Production
Corman offered the film to Kaplan on the recommendation of Martin Scorsese, who had recently made Boxcar Bertha for Corman and had taught Kaplan at New York University. Kaplan's student film Stanley had just won a prize at the National Student Film Festival and he was working as an editor in New York.

Corman allowed Kaplan to rewrite the script and to cast and edit the film. Kaplan says the only lead member of the cast selected when he came on board was then-model Alana Hamilton. Kaplan:
I'd never seen a Nurses movie. He [Corman] laid out the formula. I had to find a role for Dick Miller, show a Bulova watch, and use a Jensen automobile in the film. And he explained that there would be three nurses: a blonde, a brunette, and a nurse of colour; that the nurse of color would be involved in a political subplot, the brunette would be involved in the kinky subplot, and the blonde would be the comedy subplot. The last thing he said was "There will be nudity from the waist up, total nudity from behind, and no pubic hair - now get to work!" 
Kaplan brought out Jon Davison and Danny Opatoshu from New York to help him work on the script. The film was shot in 15 days for $75,000 and was a big hit, launching Kaplan's directing career.

Kaplan later recalled "There's some stuff in Night Call Nurses that's so stupid and so dumb, I just get a warm feeling thinking about it. It's so silly and sweet and naive and awful."

Critical responses
Writing for Turner Classic Movies, critic Nathaniel Thompson described the film as "all good fun" and "while the actresses aren't quite up to caliber [...] they're still strong, beautiful, and brave enough to keep the sometimes random chain of events grooving along just fine." Critic Budd Wilkins wrote in Slant Magazine that the film "boasts a strong storyline, lots of quirky humor, and a wooly, anything-goes visual style," with director "Kaplan [using] rapid editing, jerky handheld camerawork, and a vertiginous, downward-spiraling crane shot to place viewers in discordant POV perspectives." Writing in DVD Talk, Ian Jane described the film as "pretty gosh darned shallow but offers up enough cheap sexy thrills to make for some solid B-grade entertainment" and that it "mixes up the frequent nudity you'd expect with a few interesting horror movie elements."

See also
 List of American films of 1972

References

External links

1972 films
Films directed by Jonathan Kaplan
New World Pictures films
Films about nurses
Medical-themed films
American sex comedy films
Films produced by Julie Corman
1970s sex comedy films
1972 directorial debut films
1972 comedy films
1970s English-language films
1970s American films